Doncaster Rugby League Football Club (RLFC) is a professional rugby league football club, from Doncaster, South Yorkshire. They play in the third tier League 1.

They have previously been known as Doncaster Dragons (1995–2005) and Doncaster Lakers (2006–2007). They were also previously informally known as The Dons, but it is now their official nickname.

History

1951–1994: Foundation
From 1956–1961, Doncaster finished every season as the bottom side in the Rugby Football League, and remained consistently in the bottom three between 1963 and 1968. The 1970s, and early 1980s proved to be no easier, with Doncaster only avoiding a bottom three finish on two occasions between 1970 and 1985.

In 1980, Yorkshire Television made a one-off documentary Another Bloody Sunday, the TV crew followed the Dons as they tried to avoid finishing the season without winning a single game.

John Sheridan became head coach of the Dons in 1984. The club had no money but Sheridan still managed to put together one of the Dons' best squads and went on to win 30 of the 44 games they played under him. He was replaced by his number-two Graham Hepptinstall after a few years but a players' revolt saw him come back for a second spell. He was voted the most influential person in the club's history by the Dons fans.

On Sunday 1 September 1991, Third Division rugby was introduced into British rugby league. Doncaster entertained Nottingham City that day with the home side winning by a club record 88–6.

Doncaster won eight consecutive games under Tony Fisher, but in the penultimate game of the 1994 season they fell to a surprise 20–2 away defeat to mid-table Rochdale Hornets as Workington Town beat Keighley to take top spot. Doncaster won 10–5 in their final game away at Batley's Mount Pleasant and the club won promotion to the Premier Division for the first time in 1993–94.

1995–1997: Proposed South Yorkshire merger
In 1994–95 Tattersfield was the venue for a game against Widnes, broadcast live on Sky Television, which Doncaster won by 21–6. At that time, "The Dons" were at the top of Division 1. On 15 December 1994, Doncaster were already in trouble with debts of £1.4 million and were put into administration. The RFL took over the costs of running the club after an aborted attempt to merge the club with Sheffield Eagles . Doncaster were bought from administration by owners of Tattersfield ground in March 1995 but at the end of their one and only season in the top flight the club went into liquidation with debts of £1.4 million and the curtain closed on the Tattersfield era when the stadium was sold for housing development. The Dons played their last game at Tattersfield on 23 April 1995.

When a Rupert Murdoch funded Super League competition was proposed, part of the deal was that some traditional clubs would merge. Doncaster was to merge with Sheffield to form a South Yorkshire club that would compete in Super League. A meeting in Doncaster with Gary Hetherington from Sheffield Eagles was attended by 400 supporters and only 16 voted in favour; 3,000 people signed a petition against the merger  and Doncaster survived as an unmerged club.

1998–2004: Doncaster Dragons
The following a year, a new club called Doncaster Dragons raised from the ashes of the previous club, but was forced to restart life in the bottom division of the Rugby Football League. With Tattersfield gone they temporarily shared Belle Vue Stadium with association football club Doncaster Rovers while Meadow Court Stadium (another greyhound stadium in Stainforth, Doncaster) was being prepared for rugby league. The Dragons played at Meadow Court Stadium for a few years before returning to Belle Vue permanently for the beginning of the 1998 season.

In 1999, St. John Ellis was appointed head coach of Doncaster, he was too late to prevent them finishing 18th and last in the Premiership, making them the lowest-ranked club in the professional game. The following year, helped by some ambitious recruitment, they were third. One of Doncaster's achievements under Ellis was to become notoriously difficult to beat at home, with the Belle Vue ground unofficially renamed 'The House of Pain'. John Wright rescued Doncaster from liquidation in 2001 and oversaw the steady growth of the club, while St John remained coach.

2005–2006: Doncaster Lakers

At the end of the 2005 season Dragons was dropped and Doncaster Rugby League Club adopted the name Lakers to reflect the new Lakeside Community Stadium (now the Keepmoat Stadium), which would soon be their new home. The stadium, a purpose built community facility, would house both Lakers and Doncaster Rovers Football Club as well as women's football team Doncaster Belles.
Tony Miller was appointed head coach for the 2006 season following the untimely death on New Year's Eve 2005, of St John Ellis. Singe, as he was known familiarly by fans, was rugby league's longest serving coach at the time.

Loyal Doncaster fans began to oppose the re-branding to Lakers, especially when the club's historic colours, blue and gold, were replaced with red, white and black.

The club parted company with Tony Miller in July 2006 and former Great Britain International Alan Hunte of Salford agreed to help the club in a short-term coaching role. The sacking of Tony Miller later led to him receiving £8,000 when he took the club to court. Australian Kieran Dempsey, formerly of Parramatta, was appointed head coach on a two-year contract in August 2006 and Phil Windley was appointed as his assistant.

Ellery Hanley was appointed head coach in December 2007.  The 2007 season kicked off early for the Lakers, when they played host to a pre-season warm up against Sheffield Eagles on 27 December 2006. This was no ordinary game, as it marked the opening of the Keepmoat Stadium. Lakers, back in blue and gold, lost 16–10 in front of 5,400 spectators, the club's biggest crowd in a decade. The Lakers came bottom of their Northern Rail Cup group.

On 1 April 2007, Head Coach Keiran Dempsey and Assistant Coach Phil Windley were suspended pending an internal investigation and Gary Wilkinson was temporary placed in charge of the team. The following Friday (6 April 2007) saw the Lakers kick start the 2007 league campaign beating Sheffield Eagles 24–20 away from home. Six and a half thousand people attended the club's first game on live TV for over 10 years, on Thursday 12 April at the Keepmoat Stadium. The game shown live on Sky Sports saw Doncaster pummelled 66–4 against promotion favourites Castleford. It was announced by chairman John Wright that the club was having financial difficulties and would have to go into a CVA (Company Voluntary Agreement). The Lakers then went on to defeat joint top of the table Whitehaven 26–16. The match, which was promoted as possibly the last game of professional rugby league in Doncaster, attracted only 831 supporters. On Saturday 12 May chairman John Wright announced he was to resign from the club.

Lakers only just managed to put together a team against Rochdale Hornets away at Spotland on 20 May, after several players including Graham Holroyd and Danny Mills left the club. The team went on to lose 58–12 to the sound of the chant, 'We're proud of you' from the travelling fans. A few hours after the match, Coach Gary Wilkinson resigned. The following Tuesday (22 May), local lad and crowd favourite Peter Green was announced as Caretaker Coach. On Sunday 3 June, Lakers lost at home to Batley 48–14 and on the following Sunday 10 June at home, they suffered a massive 90–4 defeat at the hands of Widnes.Chairman John Wright announced that he would put the club in liquidation on 13 June if no buyers came forward. The crowd of over 1,200 applauded the loyal Doncaster players upon the final whistle. When Wednesday 13th came, it was announced that Doncaster-born businessmen Shane Miller and Craig Harrison had struck a deal with the RFL to set up a new club which would take over from the old one within National League 1. .

On Tuesday 19 June 2007, Doncaster announced former St Helens and Widnes forward John Stankevitch as new head coach, taking over from Peter Green. On 28 June it was announced that the new owners had decided to ditch the Lakers moniker and revert to Doncaster RLFC. In the last home game of the 2007 season, 'the Dons' put on a brilliant performance to beat Dewsbury 51–18. For the final game of the season 'the Dons' travelled to the Shay to face Halifax. Former 'Don' Graham Holroyd ran the game for Halifax, leading them to a 52–24 victory, this result meant that Doncaster had finished bottom of the 2007 League table.

2007–present: Doncaster RLFC

On 29 November 2007 it was announced on the official Doncaster website that head coach John Stankevitch had resigned, due to "personal reasons". On 14 December 2007, Ellery Hanley was unveiled as Stankevitch's replacement. The Dons were drawn into Northern Rail Cup Group 3 alongside London Skolars, Crusaders and South Yorkshire rivals Sheffield Eagles. The Dons qualified for the knock-out phase still with a game in hand by beating London at home and away as well as taking bonus points off Sheffield and Crusaders, who both play in a higher division. The Dons started the 2008 league campaign with a bang, winning three from three with 56–0, 54–12 and 36–18 wins. This saw them go top of the league at the end of March. Doncaster beat Oldham 18–10 in the National League Two Grand Final at Warrington to seal promotion alongside Gateshead and Barrow. Ellery Hanley resigned as coach, citing financial restraints.

2009 saw former player Carl Hall take over the club as part of a venture to secure the long term future of the club, and they were relegated from the Championship at the end of that season. The appointment of Tony Miller, Hanleys assistant, and former Dons player, as head coach, saw a new team built, and the side finished in mid-table of Championship One.
Small improvements were seen in 2010 and 2011, as Miller rebuilt the playing side, with an improvement to the finishing position seen each year.

2012 saw Doncaster make their biggest statement in several years, as former Hull Kingston Rovers, Hull F.C. and Wakefield Trinity stand-off, Paul Cooke was convinced to come out of retirement, and ply his trade in Championship One.
Behind Cooke, who secured the Championship One Player Of The Year, Doncaster won the League Leaders Shield as Barrow and Workington faltered with two games left, with a defeat of London Skolars. The game also saw Lee Waterman break the clubs tryscoring record. 
Having already secured promotion, Doncaster attempted to secure their second silverware of the season, by winning the Playoffs. This took a blow almost immediately, as straight from kickoff in the first match vs Barrow, the mercurial Cooke suffered a broken kneecap, ruling him out for the remainder of the season, and saw the side slump to a defeat in his absence. 
With a makeshift halfback partnership, Doncaster defeated Workington Town in the Semi Final to set up a rematch against Barrow at Warrington in the Play-off final. 
A close affair saw Barrow lead at half time, before Lee Waterman and Craig Fawcett scored tries, and a defensive effort in the last 10 minutes saw the Dons home to victory.

Association football side, Doncaster Rovers took over the club in 2013, and saw the club begin to operate under the auspices of 'Club Doncaster', a concept which sees the Football Club and Rugby Club share Commercial, Marketing and Media infrastructure, and saving on overheads. The 2013 season saw Doncaster consolidate their position in the Championship post promotion, with a Paul Cooke inspired side finishing in 4th position.
In the 2021 League 1 season, Doncaster reached the playoff final against Workington Town but were defeated 36-12.
In the 2022 League 1 season, Doncaster once again reached the playoff final with the opponents being Swinton. Doncaster lead  in the final for most of the game until a late Swinton try saw Doncaster lose 16-10.

Kit sponsors and manufacturers

2022 squad

2021 transfers

Gains

Losses

Players

Players earning international caps while at Doncaster

 Joseph "Joe" Berry Huddersfield, Doncaster, Rochdale Hornets and Batley 1998...2003 4-caps + 3-caps (sub)
 Dean Colton Doncaster 2008...present 1-cap
 Tyssul "Tuss" Griffiths won caps for Wales while at Hunslet and Doncaster 1946...1951 2-caps
 Neil Lowe won caps for Scotland Featherstone Rovers, Doncaster, York, and Keighley 1999...present 3-caps + 4-caps (sub)
 Pehi James "PJ" Solomon Lancashire Lynx and Doncaster 1997...2003 5-caps
 David Scott Represented Scotland in the 2013 World Cup.

Other notable former players
These players have either; received a Testimonial match, were international representatives before, or after, their time at Doncaster, or are notable outside of rugby league.

 Ade Adebisi
 Danny Allan
 Graham Arrand  1960/70s, also North Sydney
 Tony "Cockney Rebel" Banham 
 James "Jimmy" Banks (1970s)
 Andreas Bauer
 Jamie Bloem
 Jean-Christophe Borlin
 John Buckton
 Luke Burgess
 Dean Carroll
 Michael Coady
 Ben Cockayne
 Billy Conway
 Trevor Denton (1970s)
 Peter Edwards
 St. John Ellis
 Craig Farrell
 Jamie Fielden
 Luke Gale
 Marvin Golden
 Peter Goodchild  Doncaster's first Yorkshire representative
 Peter Green
 Scott Grix
 Michael Haley
 Carl Hall
 Gareth Handford
 Paul Handforth
 Lee Harland
 Dennis Hartley
 Roy Hawksley
 Brad Hepi
 Terry Hermansson
 Sean Hesketh
 Merv Hicks
 Graham Holroyd
 Michael Hyde
 Ben Jones
 Darren Jordan
 Tony Kemp
 Chris Langley
 Andy Hay
 Peter Larkin
 Corey Lawrie
 Jason Lee
 Zebastian Lucky Luisi
 Chris McKenna
 Colin Maskill
 Joe Mbu
 Tony Miller
 Danny Mills
 Martin Moana
 Gareth Morton
 Gavin Morgan
 Richard Newlove
 David Noble 1751-points 1976...1992 (Testimonial match 1988)
 Kevin Parkhouse
 Stuart Piper (Testimonial match 1982)
 Audley Pennant circa-1994
 Joel Penny
 Gareth Price first captain/coach in 1951 from Halifax
 Kevin Rayne
 Sam Reay
 Wayne Reittie
 Mark Roache  Record Try Scorer 111-tries 1985...1996
 Shad Royston
 Steve Edwards ( Parramatta, Newtown)
 Anthony Seuseu
 Rikki Sheriffe
 Andy Speak
 Lynton Stott
 Clive Sullivan
 Ryan Tandy
 Latham Tawhai
 Lionel Teixido
 Jamie Thackray
 Wayne (Danny) Thornton
 Tony Tonks
 Neil Turner
 Sonny Whakarau
 Kyle Wood

Past coaches
Also see :Category:Doncaster R.L.F.C. coaches.

 Gareth Price 1951
 Don Robinson 1964
 Les Belshaw Sep 1966 – Sep 1968
 Tommy Smales 1978
 Alan Rhodes 1980–1983
 Clive Sullivan 1983-1984
 John Sheridan 1984–1989
 David Sampson 1990–1991
 Tony Fisher 1993–1994
 Ian Brooke 1995-97
 Colin Maskill 1998
 St. John Ellis 1999–2005
 Tony Miller 2006
 Keiran Dempsey 2007
 Gary Wilkinson 2007
 Peter Green
 John Stankevitch 2007
 Ellery Hanley 2008
 Tony Miller 2011–2012
 Paul Cooke 2012–2015
 Gary Thornton 2015–2017
 Richard Horne 2017-

Seasons

Super League era

All-time statistics

Match 
Goals: 15, Liam Harris at Post Office Road v West Wales Raiders, 15 July 2018
Tries: 6, Kane Epati v Oldham, 30 July 2006 , Lee Waterman v Sharlston Rovers, 24 March 2012
Points: 38, Liam Harris at Post Office Road v West Wales Raiders, 15 July 2018

Season 
Goals: 129 Johnny Woodcock 2002
Tries: 35, Lee Waterman 2012
Points: 306, Johnny Woodcock 2002

Career
Goals: 773, David Noble 1974-91
Tries: 112, Mark Roache 1984-1997
Points: 1751, David Noble 1974-91

Doncaster appearances
Career: Audley Pennant 327 (1980–97)
Season: Arthur Street 40 (1951-52)

Highest score
102 v 6 West Wales Raiders - 15/7/2018

Biggest loss
4-90 v Widnes - 2007

Record crowd
10000 v Bradford Northern - 16/2/1952

All club statistics are courtesy of Ray Green/Rob Terrace (amendments required)

References

External links
 Official site

 
Rugby clubs established in 1951
Sport in Doncaster
1951 establishments in England
English rugby league teams